The A5130 was a minor A-class road in the United Kingdom, from (near) the M1 at Junction 14 to Woburn. Although the roadway still exists, it was declassified in 2017.

It started on a roundabout with the A509 just west of  Junction 14 of the M1 motorway and proceeded south round (what was then) the eastern edge of the original Milton Keynes designated area. After crossing the A421 the A5130 continued past the village of Wavendon.  It then crossed the Bedford-Bletchley railway by means of a level crossing and passed through Woburn Sands. It terminated a short distance to the south upon meeting the A4012 just inside the village of Woburn.

References 

Roads in England
Transport in Bedfordshire
Transport in Buckinghamshire
Roads in Milton Keynes